Aderinsola Khabib Eseola (born 28 June 1991) is a Ukrainian professional footballer who plays for Lviv as striker.

Career
His father is of Nigerian descent and his mother Ukrainian. He played for Polissya Zhytomyr and Dynamo Kyiv (reserves). In Autumn 2011 he moved to HinterReggio Calcio.

Desna Chernihiv
In 2015 he moved to Desna Chernihiv, the main club in Chernihiv in  Ukrainian First League, where he played 15 matches and scored 5 goals.

Arsenal Kyiv (loan)
In 2017 he moved on loan to Arsenal Kyiv, where he played 11 matches and scored 7 goals.

Akzhayik (loan)
In 2018 he moved to Akzhayik on loan, where he played 13 matches and scored 8 goals.

Kairat
On 6 June 2018, Eseola signed an 18-month contract with FC Kairat, with the option of an additional year.
On 14 November 2019, Eseola signed a new two-year contract with Kairat. He won the Kazakhstan Premier League in the season 2020.

Vorskla Poltava
In summer 2021 he moved to Vorskla Poltava in Ukrainian Premier League, where he played 2 matches and in January 2022 he left the club.

Hebar Pazardzhik
In July 2022, he signed for Hebar Pazardzhik. Here he played 15 matches and in December 2022 his contract with the club was terminated with mutual agreement.

Lviv
In January 2023 he signed for Lviv in Ukrainian Premier League.

Career statistics

Club

Honours

Club
Kairat
Kazakhstan Premier League: 2020
Kazakhstan Cup: 2018, 2019
Silver medalist: 2018, 2019

Individual
Top Scorer Kazakhstan Premier League: 2019 (19 goals) with Marin Tomasov

References

External links
 
 
 Allplayers.in.ua
 Instagram

1991 births
Living people
Footballers from Zhytomyr
Ukrainian footballers
FC Desna Chernihiv players
FC CSKA Kyiv players
Ukrainian expatriate footballers
Expatriate footballers in Italy
Ukrainian expatriate sportspeople in Italy
U.S. Vibonese Calcio players
Ukrainian people of Nigerian descent
Ukrainian Premier League players
Ukrainian First League players
FC Oleksandriya players
FC Arsenal Kyiv players
FC Zirka Kropyvnytskyi players
Association football forwards
FC Akzhayik players
FC Kairat players
FC Vorskla Poltava players
FC Hebar Pazardzhik players
Expatriate footballers in Kazakhstan
Ukrainian expatriate sportspeople in Kazakhstan
Expatriate footballers in Bulgaria
Ukrainian expatriate sportspeople in Bulgaria